The 1950–51 NBA season was the Capitols' fifth and final season in the NBA. Midway through the season, the franchise ceased operations.

Draft picks

Roster

|-
! colspan="2" style="background-color: #008000;  color: #FFFFFF; text-align: center;" | Washington Capitols 1950–51 roster
|- style="background-color: #FFFFFF; color: #008000;   text-align: center;"
! Players !! Coaches
|- 
| valign="top" |

! Pos. !! # !! Nat. !! Name !! Ht. !! Wt. !! From
|-

Regular season

Season standings

Record vs. opponents

Game log

References

Washington Capitols seasons
Washington